

The Henderson-Glenny H.S.F.II Gadfly was a British single-seat low-wing monoplane designed by K.N. Pearson and built by Glenny and Henderson Limited at Byfleet, Surrey, England in 1929.

Design and development
The Gadfly was a low-wing monoplane with a fixed conventional landing gear and an open single seat cockpit. The first aircraft, powered by a  ABC Scorpion II engine, first flew at Brooklands in April 1929. It was designated the Gadfly I and was registered G-AAEY.

The second aircraft was a Gadfly II G-AARJ which first flew in August 1929 and was exported to Canada, where it was damaged beyond repair at Kitchener, Ontario, on 25 August 1931. The final aircraft was Gadfly III G-AARK which was the same as the Gadfly II but fitted with a  Salmson A.D.9 radial engine. It was withdrawn from use in 1930. The first aircraft G-AAEY was last based at Wolverhampton when it was scrapped in June 1934.

Variants
Gadfly I
ABC Scorpion II powered, one built later converted to Gadfly II.
Gadfly II
Same as Gadfly II but fitted with Pearson rotary ailerons, one conversion and one built.
Gadfly III
Salmson A.D.9 radial-engine-powered, one built.

Specifications (Gadfly II)

References

Notes

Bibliography

1920s British civil utility aircraft
Low-wing aircraft
Aircraft first flown in 1929
Single-engined tractor aircraft